Silvio Galizia (born August 5, 1925 in Muri AG; † November 28, 1989 in Rome) was a Swiss architect and artist. Most of his life he lived and worked in Rome, Italy.

Life 
Silvio Galizia studied at the ETH Zurich. He gained his first professional experience in Zurich, Basel and Geneva. 1951–1952 he worked in Poona (India). In 1953 he settled in Rome (Italy). Here he first worked in Riccardo Morandi's studio, soon became self-employed and developed a lively planning and construction activity, mainly church buildings and other buildings for religious orders. From 1960 his artistic activity also included the design of the stained glass windows and mosaics, the altars and sculptures, the furniture and the other facilities. 

1984–1985 he realized the university and planned the cathedral of Lomé (Togo). Silvio Galizia died on November 28, 1989 in Rome. In addition to his architectural works, he left behind an extensive oeuvre of pictures, drawings, etchings (portraits, landscapes and still lifes), collages and plastic works.

Major works 

 1949–53: University College and church (Papal Seminary) in Poona (India)    
 1955–56: Reconstruction and chapel of the Collegio Internazionale Agostiniano (Rome, via del S. Uffizio 25) (together with S. Scalesse);    
 1957/64: Two private villas in Fregene and San Felice Circeo near Rome    
 1962: Pension in Terracina near Rome    
 1957–58: Curia and chapel of the Suore Missionarie dello Spirito Santo (Rome, via della Camilluccia 591);    
 1959: Curia, chapel and retirement home of the Suore di Betania dello Spirito Santo (Rome, via Achille Mauri 14)    
 1960–62: Curia, chapel and retirement home of the Suore della Divina Provvidenza (Rome, via S. Giovanni Eudes 25), later owned by the Daughters of St. Paul.    
 1960–62: Curia and church "San Giovanni Battista" of the Missionari Verbiti (Nemi near Rome) (with altars and sculptures by his brother Romano Galizia from Muri / AG, Switzerland)
 1962–66: Reconstruction and expansion of the Teutonic Cemetery in the Vatican;    
 1963–66: Chapel of the Collegio Pio Brasiliano (Rome, via Aurelia 527)    
 1963–67: Seminar of the Collegio Messicano (Rome, via del Casaletto 31) (together with F. Giardino)    
 1963–68: Reconstruction and expansion of the Palazzo Zuccari, seat of the Bibliotheca Hertziana / Max Planck Institute (Rome, via Gregoriana 28);    
 1964–66: Chiesa del Pontificio Collegio Pio Brasiliano (via Aurelia 527);    
 1964–68: Curia and chapel of the Padri e Suore Missionarie di Mariannhill (Rome, via S. Giovanni Eudes 91);    
 1966–68: Generalate of the Suore Medico-Missionarie Olandesi (Rome, via Raffaello Sardiello 20); later the Generalate of the Sisters of the Good Shepherd.    
 1966–68: Generalate and Chapel of the Sisters of Saint Paul of Chartres (Rome, via della Vignaccia 193);    
 1967–70: Monastery and church of Santa Maria degli Angeli and country courtyard of the Franciscan Sisters of Dillingen Danube (Rome, via della Storta 783);    
 1968: Reconstruction of the convent of the Convento francescano di S. Giuseppe in Assisi    
 1971–73: Church and bell tower of the Suore della Carità e dell'Immacolata Concezione di Ivrea (Rome, via di Val Cannuta 200), with colored windows by Ernesto Tross;     
 1973–74: Reconstruction and crypt of the church of the monastery of S. Chiara (Rome, via Vitellia 97);    
 1973–76: Reconstruction and establishment of the Banca Popolare di Milano (Rome, P.le Flaminio 1) (in collaboration with V. Vannini)    
 1972: Restoration and reconstruction of the church of the Convento francescano di S. Giuseppe in Assisi
 1975: Restoration and construction of the crypt for the relics of St. Francis in the Basilica of the Saint in Assisi    
 1983: University College, Church and Seminary Jean Paul II in Lomé (Togo) 

In 2005 the works and the personal archive of Silvio Galizia were included in the list of works of "historical interest" by the Italian state (Soprintendenza Archivistica).

References

External links 

 Wikimedia Commons has images of Silvio Galizia's work
 The architect's work has been included into the official Archives for Architecture of the Italian State SIUSA
 www.silviogalizia.info contains many photographs and videos of Silvio Galizia's work (in italian)

1925 births
1989 deaths